Diosa Canales (born as Dioshaily Rosfer Canales Gil on 11 January 1987 in El Tigre, Venezuela) is a Venezuelan singer, actress, and model.

Diosa Canales is set to release her first album, La Bomba Sexy de Venezuela, described as a fusion of merengue and reggaeton.

Diosa is known for making promises of getting naked if her country's national football team wins a football tournament, just like Larissa Riquelme does; the two have gotten naked in public several times already. Also, like Riquelme, she became an internet phenomenon: first, when she got naked in front of her twitcam and was watched by more than 30,000 people in less than 12 minutes and became a trending topic until she got censored by Twitter, and later when she appeared dressed in short clothes with the colors of her national football team. She has worked also as a calendar model.

In March 2015 Canales was rushed to hospital following a fall from a pole while practising a pole dancing routine; landing on her chest she burst her breast implant. She made a full recovery.

In May 2016 she and her husband Jose Roberto Rojas Romero (32) were arrested for allegedly beating up her mother-in-law.

References

21st-century Venezuelan women singers
Venezuelan female models
21st-century Venezuelan actresses
1987 births
People from El Tigre
Living people